Tsvetta Kaleynska (Bulgarian: Цвета Калейнска; born June 19, 1988),  better known as Tsvetta, is a Bulgarian author, marketing consultant and a model. She participated in the Miss Diaspora Models International Competition in New York City in 2010.

Early life 
Tsvetta was born and raised in Veliko Tarnovo, Bulgaria in the family of a university professor and a gynaecologist, both of Bulgarian descent. Kaleynska was named after her grandmother, and her name in translation from Bulgarian means “flower.” In addition to her native language, Tsvetta speaks English, French, Spanish, and Italian.  In 2008, Tsvetta moved to the United States on an academic scholarship to pursue her higher education.  In 2012, she graduated from St. Francis College, with dual degrees in Marketing Management and International Business and Economics. In 2015, she received a master's degree in Public Administration from the City University of New York at Baruch College.

Career and writing 
In 2012 Tsvetta joined the Dogs Bollocks 5 as a consulting strategist specializing in social media analysis and market research. In 2015 she moved to Brandwatch as customer success director.

Tsvetta published her first book of poetry, "Flowers From Heaven" in 2011. Her work is featured in outlets such as the national scientific magazine “Българска наука” /Bulgarian Science/, Cosmopolitan magazine and other newspapers and magazines in Eastern Europe. In 2014, Kaleynska published her second book: “#TheQueen: Social Media”.

Televised appearances 
Tsvetta began her televised appearances in 2008 through the Miss Diaspora International Pageant. Since 2011 she has been featured regularly on national TV shows in her home-country, including “Predi Obed” on bTV, TV7, “Na Kafe” on NOVA TV, TV7, Bulgarian National Television. Since 2017 she has been a contributor on the national morning show “Na Kafe” with Gala covering topics including the Women's March in NYC, the Bulgarian Parliamentary election and others.

Awards 
In November 2014, Tsvetta was awarded a silver Stevie Award in the category “Women Helping Women.” The Stevie Awards honor and generate public recognition of the achievements and positive contributions of organizations and working professionals worldwide. In 2016 Kaleynska was invited to be the first Bulgarian woman to judge the awards as well.

Public Speaking 
In 2017 Tsvetta began speaking at events and career panels on the topics of education, empowerment and motivation. She participated on a Baruch College career panel in 2017. In 2017 Tsvetta began speaking at events and panels on the topics of social media, business intelligence, empowerment, and motivation. She has spoken at multiple events, including  Baruch College, TedX@ACSofia, Emotion and AI Conference, Stevie Awards, Peace Corps, International Scientific Conference, and iHeart Radio among others.

Modeling 
In 2010 she was crowned Miss Bulgaria Diaspora USA and started her modeling career despite her height of 5’5. She has participated in fashion shoots for American and Bulgarian brands.

Charity work 
Kaleynska worked with the U.S. Bulgarian Orphanage and Medical Relief Fund to raise funds and deliver medical supplies to orphanages in Bulgaria. Her volunteer work is focused on empowering adolescent girls through GLOW (Girls Leading Our World) Leadership Academy, Bulgaria.

Tsvetta also promotes literacy among youngsters. She is the face of the national literacy campaign “Да напълним Студентски град с книги” under the patronage of Bulgaria's president, Rosen Plevlenliev. In 2013, Tsvetta started her own national literacy campaign - “Tsvetta for the colors of the languages” - aimed at providing foreign language literature to libraries and schools in small and medium-sized communities all over Bulgaria.

References

External links 
 Official website
 Na kafe
 Na kafe
 Tsvetta Kaleynska y su lucha por empoderamiento femenino | Pocketguia.es
 Spotlight On Modern-Day Superheroe - Tsvetta Kaleynska founder of RILA GLOBAL CONSULTING
 BUSINESS INTELLIGENCE AND SOCIAL MEDIA LISTENING
 Tsvetta Kaleynska Archives
 From Immigrant to CEO, This Female Embodies the American Dream

1988 births
Living people
Bulgarian female models
Bulgarian women writers
Businesspeople from New York City